Reflections is Kurt Rosenwinkel's eighth album as a band leader.

Track listing

Personnel
Kurt Rosenwinkel - Guitar
Eric Revis - Bass
Eric Harland - Drums

External links
Reflections at official site
Tom Moon review at NPR

2009 albums
Kurt Rosenwinkel albums